Pebble Hill Plantation is a plantation and museum located near Thomasville, Georgia. The plantation is listed on the National Register of Historic Places.

History
The plantation was established in the 1820s, when Thomas Jefferson Johnson built the first house. After his death, the plantation was inherited by his daughter, Julia Ann, and her husband, John H. Mitchell. They hired English architect John Wind to design a new mansion. Their slaves grew cotton, tobacco and rice.

The plantation was purchased by Howard Melville Hanna in 1896. It was passed on to his daughter Kate in 1901, who turned it into a hunting estate. After the main house burned down in 1934, architect Abram Garfield designed the new mansion, completed in 1936. After Kate's death, the plantation was inherited by her daughter, Elizabeth "Pansy" Ireland.

Through the Pebble Peach Foundation endowed by Pansy Ireland, the plantation is open to the public.

See also
Ochlocknee Missionary Baptist Church, a church founded by slaves in 1848, originally located on the outskirts of Pebble Hill Plantation

References

External links 
 Pebble Hill Plantation website
 Pebble Hill Plantation Film Collection 
 

1820s establishments in Georgia (U.S. state)
Neoclassical architecture in Georgia (U.S. state)
Colonial Revival architecture in Georgia (U.S. state)
Houses in Thomas County, Georgia
Historic house museums in Georgia (U.S. state)
Houses on the National Register of Historic Places in Georgia (U.S. state)
Museums in Thomas County, Georgia
Plantations in Georgia (U.S. state)
Historic districts on the National Register of Historic Places in Georgia (U.S. state)
National Register of Historic Places in Thomas County, Georgia